Justin Jamel Wright-Foreman (born October 27, 1997) is an American professional basketball player for the Westchester Knicks of the NBA G League. He previously played for the Shenzhen Leopards of the Chinese Basketball Association (CBA). He played college basketball for the Hofstra Pride. He was drafted by the Utah Jazz with the 53rd overall pick in the 2019 NBA draft.

College career
Hofstra coach Joe Mihalich spotted Wright-Foreman at a basketball tournament in Las Vegas where he scored 48 points in a game and offered him a scholarship. He played sparingly as a freshman due to subpar defense. His breakout game came in a blowout loss to Kentucky as a sophomore, where he scored 14 points. In subsequent games, he upped his scoring average substantially, finishing at 18.5 points per game.

As a junior, Wright-Foreman averaged 24.2 points per game, fifth-highest in NCAA Division I. He also contributed 3.1 assists per game, ninth in the Colonial Athletic Association (CAA). He scored over 30 points in seven games. At the conclusion of the regular season he was named CAA Player of the Year. Following the season Wright-Foreman declared for the 2018 NBA draft but did not hire an agent to preserve his collegiate eligibility.

Coming into his senior season, Wright-Foreman was named Preseason CAA Player of the Year. On February 9, 2019, Wright-Foreman tied a single-game school-record (set by Bill Thieben) by scoring 48 points in a win over William & Mary. The points put Wright-Foreman over the 2,000 point mark for his career. He was again named CAA Player of the Year for the 2018–19 season.

Professional career

Utah Jazz (2019–2020)
In the 2019 NBA draft, Wright-Foreman was selected 53rd overall by the Utah Jazz. On July 16, 2019, Wright-Foreman was signed to a two-way contract by the Jazz. Wright-Foreman scored 26 points and had seven rebounds and five assists for the Salt Lake City Stars in a victory over the Rio Grande Valley Vipers on November 26. On January 24, 2020, he had 30 points, three rebounds, and four assists in a win over the Stockton Kings.

Erie BayHawks (2021)
On December 19, 2020, Wright-Foreman signed an Exhibit 10 deal with the New Orleans Pelicans, but was waived the same day. On January 12, 2021, he signed as an affiliate player with the Erie BayHawks of the NBA G League, averaging  over 12 points and 2 assists in 15 games.

Chorale Roanne (2021)
On April 21, 2021, Wright-Foreman signed with Chorale Roanne Basket of the LNB Pro A. He averaged 16.9 points and 3.6 assists per game.

Petkim Spor (2021–2022)
On August 20, 2021, Wright-Foreman signed with Petkim Spor of the Turkish Basketball Super League. He averaged 16.8 points, 3.7 assists and 2.1 rebounds per game. Wright-Foreman parted ways with the team on January 28, 2022.

Birmingham Squadron (2022)
On February 10, 2022, Wright-Foreman was acquired and activated by the Birmingham Squadron of the NBA G League.

Brose Bamberg (2022)
On July 27, 2022, he has signed with Brose Bamberg of the German Basketball Bundesliga.

Westchester Knicks (2023–present)
On January 30, 2023, Wright-Foreman was acquired by the Westchester Knicks.

Career statistics

NBA

Regular season

|-
| style="text-align:left;"| 
| style="text-align:left;"| Utah
| 4 || 0 || 11.3 || .350 || .200 || .750 || 1.3 || 1.8 || .5 || .0 || 4.8
|- class="sortbottom"
| style="text-align:center;" colspan="2"| Career
| 4 || 0 || 11.3 || .350 || .200 || .750 || 1.3 || 1.8 || .5 || .0 || 4.8

College

|-
| style="text-align:left;"| 2015–16
| style="text-align:left;"| Hofstra
| 27 || 0 || 4.1 || .447 || .235 || .545 || .3 || .1 || .1 || .1 || 1.6
|-
| style="text-align:left;"| 2016–17
| style="text-align:left;"| Hofstra
| 32 || 17 || 28.3 || .493 || .372 || .764 || 3.6 || 1.6 || .8 || .1 || 18.1
|-
| style="text-align:left;"| 2017–18
| style="text-align:left;"| Hofstra
| 31 || 30 || 37.8 || .449 || .366 || .799 || 3.3 || 3.2 || .8 || .2 || 24.4
|-
| style="text-align:left;"| 2018–19
| style="text-align:left;"| Hofstra
| 35 || 35 || 37.7 || .511 || .425 || .864 || 4.0 || 2.9 || .9 || .2 || 27.1
|- class="sortbottom"
| style="text-align:center;" colspan="2"| Career
| 125 || 82 || 28.1 || .483 || .386 || .811 || 2.9 || 2.1 || .7 || .2 || 18.6

References

External links
Hofstra Pride bio
NBA Draft Profile

1997 births
Living people
21st-century African-American sportspeople
African-American basketball players
American men's basketball players
Basketball players from New York City
Birmingham Squadron players
Brose Bamberg players
Erie BayHawks (2019–2021) players
Hofstra Pride men's basketball players
People from Laurelton, Queens
Petkim Spor players
Point guards
Salt Lake City Stars players
Sportspeople from Queens, New York
United States men's national basketball team players
Utah Jazz draft picks
Utah Jazz players